Technical Groups of Independents may refer to:
 Technical Group of Independents (1979–1984) in the European Parliament
 Technical Group of Independents (1999–2001) in the European Parliament
 Technical group of small parties and independents in Dáil Éireann, Ireland